Ramila marginella is a moth in the family Crambidae. It was described by Frederic Moore in 1868. It can be found in China (Guangxi, Yunnan) and India.

Adults are silvery white, with a fuscous costa of the forewings.

References

Moths described in 1868
Schoenobiinae